The black-throated apalis (Apalis jacksoni) is a species of bird in the family Cisticolidae.
It is sparsely present from Cameroon to Kenya, markedly present in the Albertine Rift montane forests.
Its natural habitat is subtropical or tropical moist montane forest.

References

black-throated apalis
Birds of Sub-Saharan Africa
black-throated apalis
Taxonomy articles created by Polbot